Radar Base is a census-designated place (CDP) in Maverick County, Texas, United States. The population was 762 at the 2010 census.

Geography
Radar Base is located at  (28.857903, -100.527332).

It is the location of the Maverick County Memorial International Airport, which was previously Eagle Pass Army Airfield.

Demographics
As of the census of 2000, there were 162 people, 51 households, and 37 families residing in the CDP. The population density was 38.4 people per square mile (14.8/km2). There were 64 housing units at an average density of 15.2/sq mi (5.9/km2). The racial makeup of the CDP was 78.40% White, 1.85% Native American, 18.52% from other races, and 1.23% from two or more races. Hispanic or Latino of any race were 88.89% of the population.

There were 51 households, out of which 49.0% had children under the age of 18 living with them, 54.9% were married couples living together, 11.8% had a female householder with no husband present, and 25.5% were non-families. 23.5% of all households were made up of individuals, and 7.8% had someone living alone who was 65 years of age or older. The average household size was 3.18 and the average family size was 3.84.

In the CDP, the population was spread out, with 32.1% under the age of 18, 8.0% from 18 to 24, 21.0% from 25 to 44, 27.8% from 45 to 64, and 11.1% who were 65 years of age or older. The median age was 36 years. For every 100 females, there were 92.9 males. For every 100 females age 18 and over, there were 96.4 males.

The median income for a household in the CDP was $19,531, and the median income for a family was $19,531. Males had a median income of $26,250 versus $0 for females. The per capita income for the CDP was $5,983. About 42.9% of families and 42.9% of the population were below the poverty line, including 56.5% of those under the age of eighteen and none of those 65 or over.

Education
Radar Base is served by the Eagle Pass Independent School District.

References

Census-designated places in Maverick County, Texas
Census-designated places in Texas